The Orchid Dancer (French: La danseuse Orchidée) is a 1928 French silent drama film directed by Léonce Perret and starring Louise Lagrange, Ricardo Cortez and Xenia Desni. It was shot at the Victorine Studios in Nice. The film's art direction was by Jacques-Laurent Atthalin and Henri Ménessier

Synopsis
Luicha returns briefly to her home town in the Basque Country to visit her mother. She says she works as a teacher in Paris. One of the young men falls in love with her and asks her to marry him. She is attracted to him, but says she can't marry him and hastily returns to the French capital. He follows her there and discovers she is famous in Paris as an exotic dancer "The Orchid Dancer".

Cast
 Louise Lagrange as Luicha Irrigoyen, la danseuse Orchidée  
 Ricardo Cortez as Yoanes Etchegarry dit Jean Barliave  
 Xenia Desni as Marise Laborde  
 Danièle Parola as Miss Flute  
 Marthe Lepers as Kattalin 
 Gaston Jacquet as Buguelle  
 Henri Richard as Martineau  
 Sig Arno as Paulo  
 Henriette Clairval-Terof as Madeleine  
 Thérèse de Zunin as La baronne d'Ange  
 Fielding as Doulaze  
 Ernest Chambery as Le baron d'Ange  
 Armand Dutertre as Le régisseur  
 Madame Stavelly as Madame Deraing 
 Damorès as Le professeur  
 Henri Mène as Ignacio  
 M. Violette as L'aide  
 Julio de Romero as Horowitz  
 Flore Deschamps as La secrétaire 
 Marcya Capri 
 Yvette Dubost
 Nilda Duclos 
 Denise Lorys 
 Gil Roland

References

Bibliography
 Rège, Philippe. Encyclopedia of French Film Directors, Volume 1. Scarecrow Press, 2009.

External links
 

1928 films
1920s French-language films
French silent feature films
Films directed by Léonce Perret
French black-and-white films
1920s French films
Films shot at Victorine Studios
1928 drama films
French drama films
Films set in Paris